The Florida Board of Governors is a 17-member governing board that serves as the governing body for the State University System of Florida, which includes all public universities in the state of Florida.

After its predecessor, the Florida Board of Regents, was abolished by an act of the Florida Legislature that was signed into law by Governor Jeb Bush in July 2001, United States senator Bob Graham, who objected to the abolition of the statewide higher education body (Board of Regents), responded by leading a ballot initiative to restore it. The Board of Governors was established in 2003 after the successful passage of the constitutional amendment heralded by Graham in 2002. The Florida Board of Education, also appointed by the governor, oversees kindergarten through higher education, but focused mostly on K-20 education and community colleges. The Board of Governors, as part of the Florida Constitution, cannot be abolished without another constitutional amendment.

During the 2017-2018 academic year, the State University System enrolled roughly 341,000 total students and is the second largest State University System in the United States.

Board composition
The Florida Board of Governors has seventeen members, including fourteen voting members appointed by the governor, as well as, the Florida commissioner of education, the chair of the Advisory Council of Faculty Senates, and the Chair of the Florida Student Association. The board appoints a chancellor, who serves as the system's chief executive.

University campuses

Think Florida 
In January 2016, the State University System launched a statewide communications and marketing campaign to build and bolster the state's entrepreneurial climate - Think Florida: A Higher Degree for Business. The campaign's focus is a strong connection between the system's universities and Florida's businesses, with an emphasis on collaboration in the areas of talent, research and partnerships.

Performance-based funding 
The Board of Governors unveiled a performance-based funding model in 2014 to incentivize universities to improve on key metrics, from graduation rates to post-graduation success.

The model has four guiding principles:
 use metrics that align with SUS Strategic Plan goals,
 reward excellence or improvement,
 have a few clear, simple metrics, and
 acknowledge the unique mission of the different institutions.
Key components of the model:
 Institutions will be evaluated on either excellence or Improvement for each metric.
 Data is based on one-year data.
 The benchmarks for excellence were based on the Board of Governors 2025 System Strategic Plan goals and analysis of relevant data trends, whereas the benchmarks for Improvement were determined after reviewing data trends for each metric.
 The Florida Legislature and governor determine the amount of new state funding and a proportional amount of institutional funding that would come from each university's recurring state base appropriation.

Preeminent State Research Universities 
In 2010, the Florida Legislature created the Preeminent State Research University program and set 12 benchmarks to define these schools, which are awarded more state funding for research. 11 of the 12 benchmarks must be met for a school to be classified as Preeminent by the Board of Governors. The benchmarks are:

 An average weighted grade point average of 4.0 or higher on a 4.0 scale and an average SAT score of 1200 or higher on a 1600-point scale or an average ACT score of 25 or higher on a 36 score scale, using the latest published national concordance table developed jointly by the College Board and ACT, Inc., for fall semester incoming freshmen, as reported annually.
 A top-50 ranking on at least two well-known and highly respected national public university rankings, including, but not limited to, the U.S. News & World Report rankings, reflecting national preeminence, using most recent rankings.
 A freshman retention rate of 90 percent or higher for full-time, first-time-in-college students.
 A 4-year graduation rate of 60 percent or higher for full-time, first-time-in-college students.
 Six or more faculty members at the state university who are members of a national academy.
 Total annual research expenditures, including federal research expenditures, of $200 million or more.
 Total annual research expenditures in diversified nonmedical sciences of $150 million or more.
 A top-100 university national ranking for research expenditures in five or more science, technology, engineering, or mathematics fields of study.
 One hundred or more total patents awarded by the United States Patent and Trademark Office for the most recent 3-year period.
 Four hundred or more doctoral degrees awarded annually, including professional doctoral degrees awarded in medical and health care disciplines.
 Two hundred or more postdoctoral appointees annually.
 An endowment of $500 million or more.

Currently, three universities are classified as Preeminent: the University of Florida, Florida State University, and the University of South Florida. All three have exceeded each of the 12 benchmarks.

Former members

See also
State University System of Florida
University Press of Florida
State University System of Florida Libraries
Florida Institute of Oceanography
Florida Board of Control

References

External links
 

Government of Florida
State University System of Florida
Governing bodies of universities and colleges in the United States
2003 establishments in Florida